Nirmalyam is a 1973 Indian Malayalam-language film written and directed by M. T. Vasudevan Nair, and starring P. J. Antony, Sumithra and Ravi Menon. P. J. Antony won the National Film Award for Best Actor in 1974 for his performance as a velichappadu (an oracle or a medium between the Goddess and the worshipper in a Hindu temple) in this movie. The film received the National Film Award for Best Feature Film and Kerala State Film Award for Best Film in 1974. It is one of the classics in Malayalam cinema.

It is the debut of M. T. Vasudevan Nair as director and also the debut of Sukumaran and Sumithra as actors. It is the second movie of Ravi Menon, who acted earlier in a Hindi movie. This movie was a breakthrough in Ravi Menon's acting career.

The movie is an adaptation of the short story "Pallivalum Kalchilambum" by M. T. Vasudevan Nair.

Plot
The movie revolves around a neglected temple and the people dependent on the temple. P. J. Antony (Velichappadu or oracle) is the caretaker of the temple. The Velichapadu's wife Narayani (Kaviyoor Ponnamma) runs the household with the meager income from temple. His son Appu (Sukumaran) is educated but is unemployed as a result he loses faith in the temple and goddess. Velcihapadu's daughter Ammini helps him in temple rituals. The temple priest quits and starts a tea shop. A new priest from neighboring village Brahmadattan Nambothiri (Ravi Menon) now takes care of the temple. He is eager to get a government job as his situation at home is not good and younger sisters not yet married. He seduces Ammini, daughter of Velichapdu and leaves the village. Because of extreme poverty Velichapdu starts to beg. One day his son Appu tries to sell the holy sword to a pawn seller and Velichapadu finds it. He asks his son Appu to leave the house immediately.

Meanwhile, there is a smallpox outbreak in the village, first affected is Variyar's wife. Due to the outbreak of smallpox people become serious about the temple and its ritual. The villagers decide to conduct the festival in temple for the Goddess and started collecting money from all. On the day of festival Velichapadu found that his wife was selling her body to a local moneylender for a living. The Velichapadu was totally devastated. The film ends with a devastating scene. The oracle dances before the goddess, spits at her face with his blood, strikes his forehead with the sacred sword, till he falls down dead.

Cast
 P. J. Antony as Velichappad (Oracle)
 Sumithra as Velichapad's daughter Ammini
 Ravi Menon as Brahmadathan Namboothiri, the temple priest
 Kaviyoor Ponnamma as Velichapad's wife Narayani
 Sukumaran as Velichapad's son Appu
 Kunjandi as the local money lender
 Sankaradi as Ravunni Nair
 Shantha Devi
 Kottarakkara Sreedharan Nair as Valiya Thamburan
 M. S. Namboothiri
 S. P. Pillai

Production
The film's major shooting location was a small village near Edappal called Mukkola (Mukuthala). The film is produced by M. T. Vasudevan Nair under the banner of Novel Films. Cinematographer Ramachandra Babu says, "There was full co-operation from the villagers and they always were there to help us with properties for the scenes and also acting in minor and crowd scenes. In fact, they got so attached to the unit, many children were in tears when it was time for us to depart after the shooting was over. Except for the Sreekovil portion all other scenes were completed in one schedule. We had erected a set in Calicut where the Sreekovil with the idol where close-up shots were taken. It was because in the temple which was used for our shooting there were no regular Poojas taking place and moreover it was such a cramped place and customs prevent you from entering it too for placing lights etc. For other outdoor locations, we used the steps on the riverside at Thirumittakode temple for the parting song and a cave nearby for the rain sequence which was done with the help of fire engines." Post-production was done in Madras.

Veteran actor Sankaradi was also considered for the role of Velichapad. But he rejected the offer saying that his physique wouldn't suit the role. He himself suggested P. J. Antony, whose performance is still regarded as one of the finest onscreen performances ever.

Soundtrack
The music was composed by K. Raghavan. Poems written by Swathi Thirunal and Edasseri were used in the film.

Awards
 National Film Award for Best Feature Film
 National Film Award for Best Actor - P. J. Antony
 Kerala State Film Award for Best Film
 Kerala State Film Award for Best Actor - P. J. Antony
 Kerala State Film Award for Best Editor
 Kerala State Film Award for Best Screenplay

References

External links
 

1973 films
1970s Malayalam-language films
Films featuring a Best Actor National Award-winning performance
Films with screenplays by M. T. Vasudevan Nair
Best Feature Film National Film Award winners
Films shot in Kerala
Films shot in Kozhikode
Films directed by M. T. Vasudevan Nair